Las Rubias del Norte (trans. The Blondes from the North) are a band from Brooklyn, New York formed by classically trained singers Allyssa Lamb and Emily Hurst. The band is known for playing Latin music including boleros, cha cha chas, cumbias, and huaynos. The name of the band is a pun on the well-known Mexican norteño band Los Tigres del Norte.

Discography 

Rumba International (2004)
Panamericana (2006)
Ziguala (2010)

External links
Las Rubias del Norte Official Site
Interview with Las Rubias del Norte Breakfast with the Arts A&E
"Las Rubias del Norte, Latina by Voice" May 27, 2006 Weekend Edition NPR
"Jam On" April 25, 2005 Soundcheck WNYC
"Best Band With a Glockenspiel" The Village Voice
"Blonde Ambitions" Volume 19, Issue 12 New York Press

American Latin musical groups
Musical groups from Brooklyn